The 2018–19 Old Dominion Monarchs women’s basketball team will represent Old Dominion University during the 2018–19 NCAA Division I women's basketball season. The Monarchs, led by second-year head coach Nikki McCray-Penson, play their home games at Ted Constant Convocation Center and were members of Conference USA. They finished the season 21–11, 10–6 in C-USA play to finish in a tie for fifth place. They advanced to the quarterfinals of the C-USA women's tournament where they lost to WKU. They received an at-large to the Women's National Invitation Tournament where they lost to Villanova in the first round.

Roster

Schedule 

|-
!colspan=12 style=| Exhibition

|-
!colspan=12 style=|Non-conference regular season

|-
!colspan=12 style=|C-USA regular season

|-
!colspan=12 style=| C-USA Tournament

|-
!colspan=12 style=| WNIT

See also
2018–19 Old Dominion Monarchs men's basketball team

References 

Old Dominion Monarchs women's basketball seasons
Old Dominion
Old Dominion